Welcome  is a community in the municipality of Port Hope, Northumberland County, Ontario, Canada. It is located at the crossroads of County Road 10, heading north to the community of Canton; County Road 74, heading east to Dale; and County Road 2 (formerly Ontario Highway 2) heading west to Morrish and southeast to interchange 461 on Ontario Highway 401 and further southeast to the town centre of Port Hope.

References

Communities in Northumberland County, Ontario